Juiceboxxx is an American rapper, producer, and label-owner based in Milwaukee, Wisconsin.

Music
Juiceboxxx released his first album in 2005: R U There God?? Itz Me Juiceboxxx on Vicious Pop Records.

In 2010, Juiceboxxx released two mixtapes: Thunder Zone Volume One, a 20-track mixtape featuring many guests, and Journeyman From The Heartland, a 10-track mixtape recorded on the road with a variety of producers from Dillon Francis, L-Vis 1990, BzukaJoe, and others.

In 2012, Juiceboxxx released I Don't Wanna Go Into The Darkness on his newly founded Thunder Zone label.

In 2017, Juiceboxxx released Freaked Out American Loser on Dangerbird Records, a 9 track album; alongside, a short documentary that follows him on tour and examines his musical journey.

In 2022, Juiceboxxx took to social media to announce that Juiceboxxx is no longer active with the release of a new single under the name RUSTBELT.

Thunder Zone Entertainment 
Juiceboxxx founded the Thunder Zone Entertainment label in 2011, releasing a seven-inch vinyl single, "Relaxin'," by G-Side with a B side featuring the song "Impossible (Javelin Remix)," featuring Geographer and Jhi Ali. The label releases music in many formats from vinyl, CD, cassette tapes, MP3s, to WAVs and others. The label has released music by Schwarz, Dogs In Ecstasy, Odwalla88, DJ Lucas And Gods Wisdom, and others.

Writing
Juiceboxxx writes a weekly newsletter roundup of music called The Boxxx Report.

Media attention
Leon Neyfakh wrote a book profiling Juiceboxxx called The Next Next Level: A Story of Rap, Friendship, and Almost Giving Up. Neyfakh was introduced to Juiceboxxx by Milwaukee-based musician Willy Dintenfass. Dintenfass plays in Juiceboxxx's band.

References

External links 
n+1 - Leon Neyfakh - The Next Next Level - My name is Juiceboxxx!
The Impulsive Life Not Chosen - New Yorker

Year of birth missing (living people)
Living people
American hip hop record producers
American hip hop musicians
American male rappers
Midwest hip hop musicians
Rappers from Wisconsin
Record producers from Wisconsin
Songwriters from Wisconsin
21st-century American rappers
21st-century American male musicians
American male songwriters
Musicians from Milwaukee